Steroid folliculitis occurs following administration of glucocorticoids or corticotropin. Other medications can also mimic these in order to cause a similar presentation.

See also 

 List of cutaneous conditions
 Steroid acne

References

External links 

Acneiform eruptions